Baldomero Lillo (6 January 1867, in Lota, Chile – 10 September 1923, in San Bernardo, Chile) was a Chilean Naturalist author, whose works had social protest as their main theme.

Biography
Lillo's father traveled to California to participate in the 1848 Gold Rush, but returned with no fortune. He did learn much about mining, and he moved to southern Chile, Lota, to work the coal mines. Baldomero Lillo grew up in these mining communities and worked the mines himself. He was exposed to the writings of the French author Émile Zola, who used the philosophy of Positivism and the literary current of Naturalism to try to change the terrible conditions of French coal miners. Lillo was able to observe similar conditions in the Chilean mines and set out to improve the conditions of the workers by dramatizing their plight. Lillo wrote many short stories (collected in two major books, Sub Sole and Sub Terra) which sparked the interest of social activists who were appalled by the conditions in the mines. The story that follows is typical of his efforts.

In "The Devil's Tunnel" the miners are seemingly trapped by their destiny to live out their squalid and exploited lives, which are dominated by the need for raw materials and the machinery of the Europeans. At the story's end there is a strong contrast between the clean, pure and benevolent sky, and the underground monster that devours the humans who dare to penetrate its dark lair.

Excerpt: "The Devil's Tunnel", from Sub Terra

The excerpt below are the closing paragraphs of Lillo's short story about a miner who loses his life in an accident. His mother, who has lost her husband and two other sons in similar accidents, cannot emotionally deal with his death and dies in a suicidal jump into the mine, personified as a monster who consumes humans.

Footnotes

See also

References
 Adams, Nicholson B., et al. Hispanoamérica en su literatura. (2nd ed.) New York: W. W. Norton, 1993, pp. 225–234.
 Chang-Rodríguez, Raquel. Voces de Hispanoamérica. Boston: Heinle & Heinle, 2004, pp. 258–267.
 Child, Jack. Introduction to Latin American Literature: a Bilingual Anthology. Lanham: University Press of America,1994, pp. 197–210.
 Englekirk, John E. An Outline History of Spanish American Literature. New York: Appleton-Century-Crofts, 1965, pp. 92–93.
 Mujica, Bárbara. Texto y vida: introducción à la literatura hispanoamericana. New York: Harcourt Brace Jovanovich, 1992 p. 343.

External links
 
 

19th-century Chilean novelists
19th-century Chilean male writers
Chilean male novelists
People from Lota, Chile
1867 births
1923 deaths
20th-century Chilean novelists
20th-century Chilean male writers
19th-century Chilean short story writers
20th-century Chilean short story writers
Chilean male short story writers